The Hunter Passage 42 is an American sailboat that was designed by the Hunter Design Team as a cruiser and first built in 1989.

The Passage 42 may be confused with the unrelated 2016 42-foot sailboat design, the Marlow-Hunter 42SS.

Production
The design was built by Hunter Marine in the United States from 1989 to 1997, but it is now out of production.

Design
The Hunter Passage 42 is a recreational keelboat, built predominantly of fiberglass. It has a B&R masthead sloop rig, a center cockpit, a raked stem, a walk-through reverse transom with a swimming platform and folding ladder, an internally mounted spade-type rudder controlled by a wheel and a fixed wing keel. It displaces  and carries  of ballast.

Factory standard equipment included a 130% roller furling genoa, dual two-speed self tailing winches, marine VHF radio, knotmeter, depth sounder, AM/FM radio and CD player with eight speakers, anchor teak and holly cabin sole, fully enclosed head with shower, private forward and aft cabins, with bedding, a dinette table that converts to a berth, microwave oven, dual sinks, three-burner gimbaled liquid petroleum gas stove and oven and life jackets. Factory options included in mast mainsail furling, air conditioning, electric halyard winch and leather cushions. It has  of below-decks headroom.

Operational history
In a 2010 review, yacht broker Richard Jordan noted the design and space below decks, "down below showcases the strengths of Hunter. The interior layout with centerline queen aft and a saloon you could yoga in is what every cruiser lusts for." In addressing detractors, he stated, "some stuffy sailors will without thought disparage these yachts despite their advantages."

See also
List of sailing boat types

Similar sailboats
C&C 42 Custom
C&C 131
Marlow-Hunter 42SS

References

External links
Official brochure

Keelboats
1980s sailboat type designs
Sailing yachts
Sailboat type designs by Hunter Design Team
Sailboat types built by Hunter Marine